Pihlajavesi is a medium-sized lake in Central Finland. It is situated in the municipality of Keuruu (formerly Pihlajavesi) in the central Finland region. It drains through a chain of lakes into the lake Tarjanne and is a part of the Kokemäenjoki basin.

See also
List of lakes in Finland

References
 Finnish Järviwiki Web Service

Kokemäenjoki basin
Landforms of Central Finland
Lakes of Keuruu